Sheila Viard (born 3 January 1960) is a Haitian fencer. She competed in the women's individual foil event at the 1984 Summer Olympics.

References

External links
 

1960 births
Living people
Haitian female foil fencers
Olympic fencers of Haiti
Fencers at the 1984 Summer Olympics